{{DISPLAYTITLE:C34H24N6Na4O16S4}}
The molecular formula C34H24N6Na4O16S4 (molar mass: 992.80 g/mol, exact mass: 991.9723 u) may refer to:

 Direct Blue 1
 Direct Blue 15